Buildbot is a software development continuous integration tool which automates the compile or test cycle required to validate changes to the project code base. It began as a light-weight alternative to the Mozilla project's Tinderbox, and is now used by Python, WebKit, LLVM, Blender, ReactOS, and many other projects.

Implementation 
Buildbot is written in Python on top of the Twisted libraries.

SCM support 
, in version 2.10.1, Buildbot supports SCM integration with CVS, Subversion, Darcs, Mercurial, Bazaar, Git, Monotone, Repo/Gerrit, Perforce, and BitKeeper.

See also 

 Build automation
 Comparison of continuous integration software

References

External links
 
 Continuous integration with Buildbot (IBM developer blog 2010)
 CI/CD Tools Comparison (2017)

Compiling tools
Continuous integration
Free software programmed in Python
Build automation